Mosh (Get Mosh) is a digital health clinic for men that facilitates online telehealth consultations and, if appropriate, delivery of treatments to its users that suffer from hair loss and issues relating to sexual health, skincare and mental health. Mosh was founded in 2017 and in 2019 it saw Tinder co-founders take an undisclosed stake in the company. Other investors in Mosh include Parc Capital. The company is headquartered in Sydney.

Platforms
Users complete a confidential questionnaire which asks questions about their health and medical history. A doctor will review the answers and assess the user’s suitability for treatment. If the treatment requires a prescription, the doctor will contact the user via a video consult. Treatments are packaged discreetly and are dispensed by partner pharmacies on a subscription basis.

References 

Medical websites
Men's health organizations